Hisashi Sakaguchi (Sakaguchi Hisashi;  – December 22, 1995) was a Japanese manga artist and animator. After working under Osamu Tezuka, he began focusing on creating his own manga, including the Ikkyū biography series Ikkyū, before dying at the age of 49.

Life and work
At age seventeen, Sakaguchi dropped out of school to work for Osamu Tezuka's animation studio, Mushi Production. Serving as an assistant animator, he worked on the productions for Ambassador Atom, Kimba the White Lion, and Princess Knight. Sakaguchi also collaborated with Tezuka on the original manga Cleopatra, which was later adapted into the 1970 anime film of the same name. In 1969, he departed Tezuka's studio and began working independently, creating his own manga, including Version, the 1400-page Fleur de Pierre, and Ikkyū. He also illustrated the manga Wolf Guy for sci-fi writer Kazumasa Hirai.

Ikkyū (あっかんべェ一休; also known as Akanbe Ikkyū) is an imaginary biography of the titular 14th century monk, focusing on his struggles (including being the son of the Emperor of Japan) and his spiritual quest, leading him to become the wandering eccentric monk of legend. Before he could finish Ikkyū, Sakaguchi passed away from acute heart failure at the age of 49. Ikkyū was awarded the Japan Cartoonists Association Award posthumously.

See also
 Mushi Production
 Wolf Guy
 Cleopatra
 Ikkyū

References

Japanese graphic novelists
Japanese animators
Japanese cartoonists
Manga artists